Dios Hieron may refer to:
Dios Hieron (Ionia)
Dios Hieron (Lydia)